Trigarta kingdom was an ancient kingdom in northern Indian region of the Indian subcontinent with its capital at Prasthala (modern Jalandhar), Multan and Kangra.
Trigarta was founded and ruled by the Katoch Dynasty.

Mention in Mahabharata 
Trigarta was a kingdom mentioned in the epic Mahabharata. Mahabharata mentions two different Trigarta kingdoms, one in the west close to the Sivi Kingdom and the other north to the Kuru Kingdom. Modern Kangra is one of the ancient town in North Trigarta, extending westward to the Punjab area. Multan was the capital of Trigarta with its original name that is Mulasthan. The territory of Trigarta Kingdom is around the three rivers of Satluj, Beas, and Ravi. These Trigarta kings were allies of Duryodhana and enemies of Pandavas and Viratas. Their capital was named Prasthala. They attacked the Virata Kingdom aided by the Kurus to steal cattle from there. The Pandavas living there in anonymity helped the Viratas to resist the combined forces of Trigartas and Kurus. Trigarta kings fought the Kurukshetra War and were killed by Arjuna, after a ruthless and bloody conflict. Arjuna also annihilated an Akshouhini (a large military unit) of Trigarta warriors called the Samsaptakas. These warriors had vowed to either die or kill Arjuna as part of a larger plan by Duryodhana to capture Yudhishthira alive.

History

First Written Reference 
Historically, Trigarta first finds mention in the works of Panini from the 5th century B.C. who calls the inhabitants of Trigarta as "Ayudhjeevi Sangha" or a martial republic. Also mentioned as a confederation of six states known as 'Trigarta-Shashthas'.

Mention in Mahabharata of Trigarta and Susarma 
Trigarta next finds mention in the Mahabharata's Sabha Parv, where it is included along with a number of other states of the time. According to the historical consensus, the Mahabharata was first penned down around the 4th century B.C. and continued to be written until the 4th century A.D. having existed in oral form prior to this. The founder of Trigarta is mentioned as Susarma/Susharman in the Mahabharata. He was credited with building the Nagarkot/Kangra fort.

Kangra being called Susarmapura and Kalindarine 
Kangra was called Susarmapura by a variety of Sanskrit, Buddhist, Jain, and later Islamic scholars. In fact, the first mention of 'Nagarkot' comes from Islamic scholars documenting the region since they mainly referred to the fort. Prior to that, it was mainly documented as Susarmapur.
After that, they are mentioned in the works of the Greek geographer Ptolemy who calls Kangra as Kalindarine.

Alexander and Porus of Trigarta 
As mentioned by the Greeks, the ruler of Trigarta at the time of invasion by Alexander were The Kshatriaioi (Kshatris). This is also verified from the fact that Alexander had altars  near modern-day Indaura which lies in Kangra. Direct lineage can be traced to current day communities who served in the Indian army,  subsequently retiring and settling in Vasant Kunj.

Samudragupta's invasion 
Along with the Greeks, the following were mentioned as vratya kshatriyas or mlechhas: Dravida, Abhira, Sabara, Kirata, Malava, Sibi, Trigarta, and Yaudheya. Historians provide multiple historical mentions during the period between when Panini(5th Century B.C.) penned the existence of Trigarta and the 5th Century A.D. when Samudragupta invaded Trigarta and various other kingdoms.

Hiuen Tsang visits Jallandhar 
After Samudragupta, the next mention of Trigarta is from Hieun Tsang who mentions Jallandhar being ruled by Udito. Hiuen Tsang visited Jalandhara in 635 A.D. and gave details that it was a country 1000 li (about 267 km) in breadth from north to south.

The Chamba Inscription and Invasion by Ghazni 
Then, in the 8th century A.D, the Trigarta rulers acknowledged supremacy of the Karkota rulers of Kashmir. This is also mentioned in the Rajtarangini. From the 9th century to the 11th century, there are various mentions, one of the important ones being the 10th century Chamba inscription which mentions the Trigarta raja being subdued by Sahilavarman and then becoming an ally. It was also during this time that Ghazni entered the Kangra fort (1009 A.D.) while the Kangra forces were away on war. The ruler of the time was Jagdish Chandra. From that point on, save one or two rulers, all rulers of the Katoch dynasty vanshavali can be traced down to the last king.

Shifting of Capital from Jalandhar to Kangra 
The Trigarta capital was moved from Jalandhara to Nagarkot(Kangra) in 1070 A.D. as mentioned due to constant contact in Jalandhar with various ambitious invading forces who usually were en route to middle India.

Ferishta's writings 
Ferishta mentioned another account of the 1st century A.D. when the king of Kanauj, Raja Ram Deo, went on conquest and overran the hills. He spared Kumaon raja after getting his daughter in marriage, then he spared Nagarkot raja after the ruler offered his daughter in marriage.

Antiquity of Katoch Rulers and Nagarkot 
Nagarkot (Kangra fort) was the citadel of Katoch lords who ruled Trigarta for thousands of years, right from Mahabharata period till pre-independent era and in modern days Trigarta Rulers have their five divisions Katoch clan,     Guleria clan, Jaswal clan Sibaia clan and Dadwal clan. .

Katoch dynasty 
The Katoch dynasty is an offshoot of Trigratraje Dynasty. It is claimed to have ruled this area and the above story from the Mahabharata is recorded in their history. Maharaja Susharma Chand had fought against Arjuna. His son built the Kangra Fort. Katoch Dynasty, in Kali Yuga, has also its famous sub clans as Dadwal Dynasty, Jaswal Dynasty, Guleria Dynasty, Sibaia Dynasty, Chib Dynasty.

See also 
 Kingdoms of Ancient India
 Kangra-Lambagraon

References

Sources
Mahabharata of Krishna Dwaipayana Vyasa, translated to English by Kisari Mohan Ganguli

External links

Kingdoms in the Mahabharata
Kangra, Himachal Pradesh